The following lists events that happened during 2021 in East Africa. The countries listed are those described in the United Nations geoscheme for East Africa: 
 Burundi,  Comoros,  Djibouti,  Eritrea,  Ethiopia,  Kenya,  Madagascar,  Malawi,  Mauritius,  Mayotte,  Mozambique,  Réunion,  Rwanda,  Seychelles,  Somalia,  South Sudan,  Tanzania, Uganda,  Zambia,  Zimbabwe.

Incumbents

Burundi

Chief of state and Head of government: President: Évariste Ndayishimiye, (since 2020).
First Vice President Gaston Sindimwo (since 2015)
Second Vice President Joseph Butore (since 2015)

Comoros 

Chief of state and Head of government: President Azali Assoumani (since 2016)

Comoros also claims the island of Mayotte.

Djibouti 

Chief of state: President Ismail Omar Guelleh (since 1999)
Head of government: Prime Minister Abdoulkader Kamil Mohamed (since 2013)

Eritrea 

Chief of state and Head of government: President Isaias Afwerki (since 1993)

Ethiopia 

Chief of state: President Sahle-Work Zewde (since 2018)
Head of government:Prime Minister Abiy Ahmed (since 2018)
Deputy Prime Minister Demeke Mekonnen (since 2012)

Kenya 

Chief of state and Head of government: President Uhuru Kenyatta (since 2013)
Deputy President: William Ruto (since 2013)

Madagascar 

Chief of state: President Andry Rajoelina (since 2019)
Head of government: Prime Minister Christian Ntsay (since 2018)

Malawi 

Chief of state and Head of government: President Lazarus Chakwera (starting 2020)
Vice-President Saulos Chilima (since 2020)

Mauritius 

Chief of state: President Prithvirajsing Roopun (since 2019)
Head of government: Prime Minister Pravind Jugnauth (since 2017)

Mauritius claims sovereignty over the Chagos Archipelago (including Diego Garcia), although this claim is disputed by the UK.

Mayotte 
 
Chief of state: President of France Emmanuel Macron (since 2017)
Head of government: Prime Minister of France Édouard Philippe (since 2017)
President of the Departmental Council Soibahadine Ibrahim Ramadani (since 2015)

Mayotte is an overseas department and region of France also claimed by Comoros.

Mozambique 

Chief of state: President Filipe Nyusi (since 2015)
Head of government: Prime Minister Carlos Agostinho do Rosário (since 2015)

Réunion 
 Réunion is an overseas department and region of France.

Chief of state: President Emmanuel Macron (since 2017)
Head of government: Prime Minister of France: Édouard Philippe (since 2017)
 President of the Regional Council: Didier Robert (since 2010)

Rwanda 

Chief of state: President Paul Kagame (since 2000)
Head of government: Prime Minister Édouard Ngirente (since 2017)

Seychelles 

Chief of state and Head of government: President Wavel Ramkalawan (starting 2020).
Vice-President: Ahmed Afif (starting October 26, 2020)

Somalia 

Chief of state: President Mohamed Abdullahi Mohamed (since 2017)
Head of government: Prime Minister> Mohamed Hussein Roble (starting 2020)

Somaliland

The Republic of Somaliland claims independence from Somalia.
President: Muse Bihi Abdi
Vice President: Abdirahman Saylici
 Speaker of the House: Bashe Mohamed Farah
 Chairman of Elders: Suleiman Mohamoud Adan
 Chief Justice: Adan Haji Ali

South Sudan 

 

Chief of state and Head of government: President Salva Kiir Mayardit (since 2011)
First Vice-President Taban Deng Gai (since 2016)
 Second Vice President James Wani Igga (since 2016)

Tanzania 

Chief of state and Head of government: President 
John Magufuli (died March 17)
Samia Suluhu (starting March 17)
Vice-President 
Samia Suluhu (until March 17)
Head of government: Prime Minister: Kassim Majaliwa (since 2015)

Uganda

Chief of state: President, Yoweri Museveni (since 1988)
Vice President: Edward Ssekandi (since 2011)
Head of government: Prime Minister Ruhakana Rugunda (since 2014)
First Deputy Prime Minister: Moses Ali (since 2016)
Second Deputy Prime Minister Kirunda Kivenjinja (since 2016)

Zambia

Chief of state and Head of government: President, Edgar Lungu (since 2015)
Vice-President Inonge Wina (since 2015)

Zimbabwe

Chief of state: President Emmerson Mnangagwa (since 2017)
Vice-President
Kembo Mohadi (until March 1)

Monthly events

January
January 13 – Sudan claims an Ethiopian military plane crossed its border. Ethiopia denies it.
January 14
The World Food Programme (WFP) says that 1.35 million people in Madagascar are food insecure and need US$35 million in emergency aid.
U.S. Immigration and Customs Enforcement deports 100 asylum-seekers from Somalia, Ethiopia, and Kenya to Nairobi days before the inauguration of President-elect Joe Biden.
January 18 – Internet service is restored in 90% of Uganda after a five-day blackout; Bobi Wine remains under house arrest since 15 January.
January 19
Tensions rise along the border between Sudan and Ethiopia days after Sudan accused Ethiopia of violating its airspace. South Sudan has offered to mediate.
Cyclone Eloise makes landfall in Madagascar, killing one.
January 23
Ugandan peace-keeprers in Sigaale, Adimole, and Kayitoy, Somalia, kill 189 Al-Shabaab fighters.
Cyclone Eloise: 100,000 people are evacuated when the hurricane hits, but flooding and damage have been slight in Mozambique. Four deaths have been confirmed.
January 24
COVID-19 pandemic: Four members of the Cabinet of Zimbabwe die in the first two weeks of January.
Reverien Ndikuriyo is chosen as the leader of the National Council for the Defense of Democracy – Forces for the Defense of Democracy (CNDD–FDD) in Burundi.
January 25 – Tigray War: Members of the Eritrean Army are accused of widespread looting and weaponizing hunger. Eritrea denies it has soldiers in Ethiopia.
January 27 – The United States Department of State demands that Eritrea withdraw from Tigray.

February
February 4 – The ICC finds Dominic Ongwen, 45, of the Lord's Resistance Army (LRA) guilty of war crimes and crimes against humanity.
February 7 – DR Congo President Felix Tshisekedi, new chair of the African Union, says he intends to make settlement of the dispute over Ethiopia's Renaissance Dam a priority.
February 9 – The single hospital in Mayotte is overwhelmed with COVID-19 patients.
February 22 – Fifteen Tigrayans among Ethiopian peacekeepers who were due to return home on Monday ask to remain in South Sudan, citing fears of going back to Ethiopia.
February 24 – Egypt endorses Sudan's proposal to internationalize the Ethiopian Renaissance Dam controversy, calling for the participation of the African Union, the United Nations, the European Union, and the United States.

March
March 1 – Zimbabwe vice president Kembo Mohadi resigns after allegations of sexual misconduct.
March 9 – Workers in Mauritius begin pumping 130 tons of fuel from the Chinese fishing boat Lu Rong Yuan Yu that ran aground on a coral reef.

Scheduled events

Elections
 January 14 – 2021 Ugandan general election: Incumbent Yoweri Museveni was declared the winner with 5.85 million votes (58.64%); the main opposition candidate, Bobi Wine alleged fraud.
 February 8 – 2021 Somali presidential election: postponed indefinitely; international groups insist a new date be established to prevent violence.
 2021 Somali parliamentary election 
May – 2021 Somaliland municipal elections.
May – 2021 Somaliland parliamentary election.
 June 5 – 2021 Ethiopian general election

Holidays

January and February 

 January 1 – New Year's Day, (Gregorian calendar)
 January 7 – Orthodox Christmas, Public holidays in Eritrea and Public holidays in Ethiopia
 January 12 – Zanzibar Revolution Day, Public holidays in Tanzania.
 January 15 – John Chilembwe Day, Public holidays in Malawi.
 January 26 – National Resistance Movement Day, Public holidays in Uganda.
 January 28 – Thaipusam, Public holidays and festivals in Mauritius (Tamil Hindu holiday).
 February 1 – Heroes' Day, Public holidays in Rwanda.
 February 3 – Heroes' Day, Public holidays in Mozambique.
 February 16 – Janani Luwum Day, Uganda.
 February 22 – Robert Mugabe National Youth Day, Public holidays in Zimbabwe.

March and April 

 March 2 – Victory at Adwa Day, Ethiopia.
 March 3 – Martyrs' Day, Malawi.
 March 8 – International Women's Day.
 March 11 – Isra and Mi'raj, Public holidays in Djibouti, the Prophet's Night Journey.
 March 12
 National Day, Mauritius.
 Youth Day, Public holidays in Zambia.
 March 18 – Cheikh Al Maarouf Day, Public holidays in the Comoros
 March 29 – Martyrs' Day, Public holidays in Madagascar.
 April 1–3 – Maundy Thursday, Good Friday, Holy Saturday
 April 5 – Easter Monday
 April 7 – Abeid Karume Day, Tanzania.
 April 19 – Independence Day, Zimbabwe.
 April 26 – Union Day, Tanzania.

May and June 

 May 1 – Labour Day or International Workers' Day
 May 5 – Patriots' Victory Day, Ethiopia.
 May 13 – Eid al-Fitr, Muslim feast of breaking of the Fast.
 May 16 – Sudan People's Liberation Army Day, Public holidays in South Sudan.
 May 24 – Independence Day (Eritrea)
 May 25 – Africa Day
 June 1 – Madaraka Day, Public holidays in Kenya.
 June 18 – Constitution Day, Public holidays in Seychelles.
 June 20 – Martyrs' Day (Eritrea)
 June 25 – Independence Day, Mozambique.
 June 26
 Independence Day, Madagascar.
 Independence Day, Public holidays in Somalia.
 June 27 – Independence Day, Djibouti.
 June 29 – Independence Day, Seychelles.

July and August 

 July 1
 Independence Day, Public holiday in Burundi (since 1962)
 Independence Day, Rwanda (since 1962).
 Republic Day, Somalia.
 July 4 – Liberation Day (Rwanda).
 July 5 – Heroes' Day, Zambia.
 July 6
 National Day, Comoros.
 Independence Day, Malawi.
 July 20 – Eid al-Adha, holiest Islamic feast of the year.
 July 30 – Martyrs' Day, South Sudan.
 August 8 – Nane Nane Day, Tanzania.
 August 15 – Assumption of Mary, Roman Catholic feast celebrated in the Seychelles.

September and October 

 September 7 – Victory Day, Mozambique.
 October 9 – Independence Day, Uganda.
 October 11 – Huduma Day, Kenya.
 October 18 – Day of Prayer, Zambia.
 October 25 – Independence Day, Zambia.

November and December 

 November 2 – Indian Arrival Day, Mauritius.
 November 12 – Maore Day, Comoros
 December 9 – Independence Day, Tanzania.
 December 13 – Jamhuri Day, Kenya.
 December 22 – Unity Day, Zimbabwe.
 December 25 – Christmas Day, Western Christian holiday
 December 26 – Boxing Day (Utamaduni Day in Kenya)

Culture

February 4 – MTV Africa Music Awards, to be held in Kampala, are postponed due to disputes over the 2021 Ugandan general election.

Sports
January 16 – It was announced that Madagascar will organize the 2023 Indian Ocean Islands Games since the Seychelles has withdrawn.

Deaths

January to March
January 12 – Sidik Mia, 56, Malawi politician, MP (2004–2014), Minister of Defence (2009–2010), Minister of Transport and Public Works (since 2020); COVID-19.
January 18 – Joevana Charles, 66, Seychellois politician, member of the National Assembly (1993–2016).
January 20 – Sibusiso Moyo, 61, Zimbabwean politician (Ministry of Foreign Affairs); COVID-19.
February 17 – Seif Sharif Hamad, 77, Vice President of Zanzibar (December 7, 2020 – February 17, 2021), Tanzania; acute pneumonia related to COVID-19.
March 6 – Nicolas Bwakira, 79, Burundian diplomat. (death announced on this date)
March 10 – Ali Mahdi Muhammad, 82, Somali politician, president (1991–1997); COVID-19.
March 17 – John Magufuli, 61, Tanzanian politician, president (since 2015), minister of works, transports and communications (2000–2005, 2010–2015) and MP (1995–2015); heart failure.
March 29 – Sarah Onyango Obama, 99, Kenyan educator and philanthropist, grandmother of former U.S. President Barack Obama; complications from diabetes and a stroke.

April to June

See also

2020–21 South-West Indian Ocean cyclone season
2021–22 South-West Indian Ocean cyclone season
2021 in Middle Africa
2021 in North Africa
2021 in Southern Africa
2021 in West Africa
2020s
2020s in political history
Grand Ethiopian Renaissance Dam
African Union
Common Market for Eastern and Southern Africa
International Organisation of La Francophonie (OIF)
East African Community
Southern African Development Community
Community of Sahel–Saharan States
War in Darfur
Tigray War

References

External links

 allAfrica news site

2021 in Africa
Events in Africa
2021 in African sport